Quchash (also Romanized as Qūchāsh) is a village in Hajjilar-e Shomali Rural District, Hajjilar District, Chaypareh County, West Azerbaijan Province, Iran. At the 2006 census, its population was 145, in 27 families.

References 

Populated places in Chaypareh County